Hans E. Wallman, in Sweden known as Hasse Wallman (pronounced hah-seh), né Hans Erik Wallman (1 May 1936 – 22 September 2014) in Stockholm, was a Swedish entrepreneur, impresario, composer, director, author, producer and entertainment executive. At his own venues in Stockholm he has presented acts like the Beatles (1963), Rolling Stones and Lill-Babs.

Career
Wallman went to Beckmans school of advertising, was in charge of publicity for Elektra Records in Sweden 1965–1966 and was hired to head promotion for the Gröna Lund amusement park 1961–1968. From 1956 he has had his own company; he ran an entertainment palace called Kingside 1956–1962, the restaurant Badholmen Saltsjöbaden in 1962–1968, Knäppingen in Norrköping 1964–1968, Bacchi Wapen 1972–1993, the hotel ship Mälardrottningen on the Lady Hutton 1982–1996, China Theater 1982–1991 och Folkan Theater 1991–2005. In Stockholm he had Engelen och Kolingen from 1969, Golden Hits from 1994, and Intiman Theatre from 1997. He started the Wallman's Saloons chain in 1991 and developed the concept of waiters and waitresses putting on a big nightclub show.

For his contributions to entertainment he was awarded Guldmasken in 1991, named "company owner of the year" for Stockholm in 2000, was given the Albert Bonnier Prize for company owners in 2003 and dubbed Old Dane of the Year by an organization in Malmö in 2007. Wallmans Nöjen (Wallman's Fun Things) continues to run many of the restaurants he had.

He hosted Sommar in 2008.

Personal life
Wallman married his wife Marie in 1965, and they had a daughter Veronica the following year and a son Marcus in 1970.

He died on 22 September 2014 of injuries sustained in a riding accident at his home in Värmdö.

Directed movies
 1967 Drra på – kul grej på väg till Götet
 1966 Grejen

Movie scripts
 1967 Drra på – kul grej på väg till Götet
 1966 Åsa-Nisse i raketform

Movie parts
 1965 Åsa-Nisse slår till 
 1965 För tapperhet i tält

Bibliography
För nöjes skull; Hasse Wallman berättar för Olov Svedelid

References

External links

SR Sommar i P1 med Hasse Wallman 18 juli 2008.

1936 births
Swedish film producers
Swedish composers
Swedish male composers
Swedish directors
2014 deaths